Valentijn is both a masculine Dutch given name and a surname. It may refer to:

François Valentijn (1666–1727), Dutch minister, historian and writer
Jahri Valentijn (born 1984), Dutch footballer
Marinus Valentijn (1900–1991), Dutch cyclist
Valentijn Overeem (born 1976), Dutch mixed martial artist and kickboxer

Dutch-language surnames
Dutch masculine given names